William Gordon Brantley (September 18, 1860 – September 11, 1934) was an American politician and lawyer.

Brantley was born in Blackshear, Georgia. He attended the University of Georgia (UGA) in Athens, gained admission to the state bar in 1881, and began practicing law in Blackshear.

Brantley was elected to the Georgia State House of Representatives in 1884 and 1885 and the
Georgia Senate in 1886 and 1887. In 1888, he became solicitor general of the Brunswick, Georgia Circuit Court. In 1896, Brantley successfully ran for the United States House of Representatives and was re-elected seven more terms until deciding not to run for re-election in 1912. Brantley served as a delegate the Democratic National Convention in that year.

After his congressional service, Brantley remained in Washington, D.C. to practice law. He died in that city in 1934 and was buried in Blackshear Cemetery in the town of his birth.

Congressman Brantley is the namesake to Brantley County, Georgia.

Notes

References
 
 GeorgiaInfo Brantley County Courthouse History
 GeorgiaInfo record of the Brantley County State Historical Marker
 History of the University of Georgia, Thomas Walter Reed, Imprint: Athens, Georgia: University of Georgia, ca. 1949, p.1161

External links
 

1860 births
1934 deaths
People from Blackshear, Georgia
American Presbyterians
Members of the Georgia House of Representatives
Georgia (U.S. state) state senators
Georgia (U.S. state) lawyers
University of Georgia people
Brantley County, Georgia
Democratic Party members of the United States House of Representatives from Georgia (U.S. state)
Washington, D.C., Democrats